Bent Jensen may refer to:

 Bent Jensen (equestrian) (born 1955), Danish Olympic equestrian
 Bent Jensen (footballer) (born 1947), Danish football player
 Bent Jensen (rower) (1925–2016), Danish rower
 Bent Jensen (businessman) (born 1951/52), Danish businessman
 Bent Jensen (speedway rider), Danish speedway rider